National symbols of Thailand are the symbols that are used in Thailand to represent what is unique about the nation, reflecting different aspects of its cultural life, history and biodiversity.

In addition to the country's official emblems, there are three officially proclaimed national symbols, listed in a declaration of the Office of the Prime Minister dated 26 October 2001. Other national symbols have also since been named by other agencies.

Symbols

See also 
 Sansoen Phra Barami
 Culture of Thailand

References